The Suor Uyata is a mountain range in the Sakha Republic, Far Eastern Federal District, Russia.

History
The Suor Uyata was first mapped in the summer of 1870 by geographer and ethnologist Baron Gerhard von Maydell (1835–1894) during his pioneering research of East Siberia.

Geography
The Suor Uyata rises in the northwestern area of the Kolyma Lowland, only  to the east of the eastern end of the Ulakhan-Sis Range. It is a smaller range than the latter, of which it can be considered an eastern prolongation.

The Suor Uyata is surrounded on all sides by marshy areas with slow-flowing rivers and a multitude of lakes. The sources of several rivers are on the range, including the Bolshaya Khomus-Yuryakh, Maly Khomus-Yuryakh, Kumuruk-Yuryakh, Soldat and Bya, as well as some source area tributaries of the Sundrun River on the western side.

Flora and fauna
The area of the Suor Uyata is marked by permafrost. The climate is subarctic and severe and the range is covered in mountain tundra. 

The area of the Suor Uyata is part of the migration corridor of the Sundrun reindeer population, which includes the adjoining Ulakhan-Tas, the Kondakov Plateau to the NW, and the forest tundra of the Rossokha River basin. The Suor Uyata / Ulakhan Tas mountain zone is a protected area, a regional nature reserve.

References

External links
Magmatic and ore formations of the Ulakhan-Tas (in Russian)
Mountain ranges of the Sakha Republic